Enrique Alejandro Zúñiga Castro (born July 7, 1976) is a Mexican professional basketball player. He is a 6'4" Forward who currently plays for Pioneros de Quintana Roo in the Liga Nacional de Baloncesto Profesional in Mexico.  Born in Guadalajara, Mexico, he is a member of the Mexico national basketball team.

College career
Zúñiga spent his college career playing in NCAA Division II with Grand Canyon University

Professional career
Since turning professional in 1999, Zúñiga has spent his entire career in the Mexican professional league, save for a brief 2005 spell for two teams in Hungary. His best season, based on averages, was his first season for Lechugueros de León (2005–06), in which he averaged 18.6 points and 3.4 assists per game. He had another successful season for the team in 2007-08, averaging 18.2 points per game. Midway through the 2008-09 season, he moved to Pioneros de Quintana Roo, where he will begin the 2009-10 season.

National team career
Zúñiga is a long-time member of the Mexico national basketball team. He first competed with the team at the 2003 Centrobasket, and he has since competed for the team at the 2004 Centrobasket and 2006 Centrobasket and the FIBA Americas Championship in 2005, 2007, and 2009.

References

External links
 RealGM profile

1976 births
Living people
Barreteros de Zacatecas players
Basketball players at the 2003 Pan American Games
Basketball players from Jalisco
Grand Canyon Antelopes men's basketball players
Guards (basketball)
Jefes de Fuerza Lagunera players
Lechugueros de León players
Mexican expatriate basketball people in Hungary
Mexican expatriate basketball people in the United States
Mexican men's basketball players
Pioneros de Quintana Roo players
Soles de Mexicali players
Sportspeople from Guadalajara, Jalisco
Pan American Games competitors for Mexico